A list of films produced in Egypt in 1971. For an A-Z list of films currently on Wikipedia, see :Category:Egyptian films.

External links
 Egyptian films of 1971 at the Internet Movie Database
 Egyptian films of 1971 elCinema.com

Lists of Egyptian films by year
1971 in Egypt
Lists of 1971 films by country or language